The 2014 Uzbek League was the 23rd season of top level football in Uzbekistan since independence in 1992. Bunyodkor were the defending champions from the 2013 campaign.

Teams

FK Guliston and Shurtan Guzar were relegated in the last edition of the Uzbek League to First League. FK Andijan and Mash'al Mubarek replace them.

Managerial changes

League table

Results

Season statistics

Top goalscorers

Last updated: 7 November 2014
Source: Soccerway

Hat–tricks

4 Player scored four goals

Awards

Monthly awards

References

External links
Uzbekistan PFL - Official League Site  

Uzbekistan Super League seasons
1
Uzbek
Uzbek